Oleksandr Ivanovych Matkobozhyk (born 3 January 1998) is a Ukrainian professional footballer who plays as a defender for Karpaty Lviv.

Career
Matkobozhyk is a product of Youth Sportive School in his native Liublynets (his first trainer was Yuriy Mazur) and BRW-VIK Volodymyr-Volynskyi. In summer 2015 he signed a contract with FC Zirka in the Ukrainian First League.

He made his debut for FC Zirka Kropyvnytskyi in the Ukrainian Premier League as a substituted player in a match against FC Vorskla Poltava on 16 October 2016.

References

External links
 
 

1998 births
Living people
People from Kovel
Ukrainian footballers
Association football defenders
FC Zirka Kropyvnytskyi players
FC Volyn Lutsk players
FC Mynai players
FC Karpaty Lviv players
NK Veres Rivne players
Ukrainian Premier League players
Ukrainian First League players
Ukrainian Second League players
Sportspeople from Volyn Oblast